Patrick Francis Daniel Farmer  (born 14 March 1962) is an ultra-marathon athlete, motivational speaker, and former Australian politician who served as a Member of the Australian House of Representatives, representing the seat of Macarthur in south-west Sydney from 2001 to 2010, as a member of the Liberal Party. Farmer has an established reputation in international and national ultra-marathons. Between April 2011 and January 2012, Farmer successfully completed the world's longest ultra-marathon, a "Pole to Pole Run"  from the North Pole to the South Pole, raising 100,000 for Red Cross International.

Biography
Farmer was born in the Sydney suburb of Ultimo, one of seven children to Mary and Frank Farmer and grew up in Sydney's western suburbs, starting his working life as a motor mechanic from 1977 to 1984 after attending Granville TAFE.

From 1984 to 2000, Farmer commenced his passion of ultra-marathon running while working with his brother Tony as a landscape gardener and later as a motivational speaker. In 1992, he married Lisa Bullivant and they bought land in Catherine Field, where they began building their family home. They went on to have two children, Brooke and Dillon. In 1998, Lisa, aged 34, died unexpectedly of Mitral Valve Prolapse and Farmer was left to raise his two children on his own.

During this period, Farmer set a number of ultra-marathon Australian and world records, which placed him in the elite of the sport. Before joining politics in 2001, he raised very significant funds for Diabetes Australia, Lifeline, Careflight International and the Westmead Millennium Institute for Medical Research. Farmer is perhaps best known for his record-breaking 14,964 km Centenary of Federation run around all of Australia in 1999, taking 191 days. These records were never ratified and are still held by Gary Parsons of Queensland. This event raised considerable funds for charity. He was named Achiever of the Year at the Australian of the Year Awards 2000, presented by Prime Minister John Howard.

Political career
Following his ultra-marathon, Farmer was approached by Howard in 2000 and encouraged Farmer to seek Liberal endorsement for the Sydney-area seat of Division of Macarthur. The seat had been reconfigured to be a notional Labor seat after losing nearly all of its rural territory, but Farmer retained it for the Liberals on a swing of seven percent, and actually won enough primary votes to take the seat without the need for preferences. He was returned in 2004 with an increased margin.

During his time in Parliament, Farmer served on a range of House of Representatives committees including: Education and Training from 26 September 2002 to 31 August 2004; Communications, Information Technology and the Arts from 4 November 2003 to 31 August 2004. On 26 October 2004 he was appointed Parliamentary Secretary to the Minister for Education, Science and Training (with special responsibility for Western Sydney).

Farmer suffered a 10.43 percent swing against him at the 2007 federal election, in which the Howard Government lost to Kevin Rudd's Labor Party. Farmer retained his seat with a margin of 0.7 percent, becoming the first opposition MP in the seat's history. After the election he was appointed the Shadow Minister for Youth and Sport.

In January 2008 he moved to Mosman on Sydney's harbourside against the advice of then Liberal Party leader Brendan Nelson, but stated that it would not affect his ability to represent his electorate in the city's western suburbs. On 22 September he was dropped from the shadow ministry by the newly elected opposition leader Malcolm Turnbull. In August 2009 Farmer was reported to be considering standing for the New South Wales Legislative Assembly after a redistribution erased his already tenuous margin in Macarthur, making it notionally Labor.

In a Liberal Party preselection ballot for Macarthur, held on 30 October 2009, Farmer was defeated by Russell Matheson and retired from politics at the 2010 federal election. His stock was considerably weakened in 2007 when he moved to the North Shore suburb of Mosman, far outside his electorate.

On 2 February 2015, Farmer announced that he would be contesting the 2015 NSW State Election as the Liberal candidate in Macquarie Fields, which included a small slice of his old federal seat.  He got a significant boost from a redistribution that made the Labor-held seat notionally Liberal.  However, he was defeated on a nearly 10-point swing by Labor candidate Anoulack Chanthivong.

Farmer unsuccessfully contested Maroubra as the Liberal candidate at the 2019 New South Wales state election.

Pole to Pole Run
Farmer departed the North Pole on 8 April 2011 and finished at the South Pole on 19 January 2012, raising A$100,000 for his efforts. Though the project is called "Pole to Pole" he had stages where he was allowed to take vehicles. Therefore, the record has never been ratified. In March 2012, John Howard launched Farmer's memoirs on the journey, called Pole to pole: one man, 20 million steps. Interviewed on Radio National Breakfast, Farmer stated that proceeds of book sales would go to Red Cross's campaign for clean water programs.

Published works

Bibliography

References

External links
 Pole To Pole Run
 
Davson records Pat Farmer's Life in her art
2010–2012 Davson the artist was a Sponsor of the Pole to Pole run
Pat Farmer a Patron of the Davson Arts Museum
Pole to Pole run painted
2014 Middle East Peace Run
2014 Jerusalem
2014 Middle East Peace Run

1962 births
Living people
Liberal Party of Australia members of the Parliament of Australia
Members of the Australian House of Representatives
Members of the Australian House of Representatives for Macarthur
Australian ultramarathon runners
Australian sportsperson-politicians
Members of the Order of Australia
Australian male long-distance runners
Male ultramarathon runners
21st-century Australian politicians